Josep Balsells Auter (26 July 1905 – 26 August 1987) was a Spanish rowing coxswain. He competed in the men's coxed four event at the 1924 Summer Olympics.

References

External links
 

1905 births
1987 deaths
Spanish male rowers
Olympic rowers of Spain
Rowers at the 1924 Summer Olympics
Rowers from Barcelona
Coxswains (rowing)